Radek Rabušic (born 21 November 1963) is a retired Czech football goalkeeper and later manager.

References

1963 births
Living people
Czech footballers
FC Zbrojovka Brno players
FC Slavia Karlovy Vary players
Edessaikos F.C. players
Czech First League players
Super League Greece players
Association football goalkeepers
Czech football managers
Niki Volos F.C. managers
Czech expatriate footballers
Expatriate footballers in Greece
Expatriate football managers in Greece
Czech expatriate sportspeople in Greece
People from Břeclav
Sportspeople from the South Moravian Region